Espasa-Calpe was a Spanish publisher which existed during the 20th century. It was created in 1925, by the union of Editorial Calpe, founded by Nicolás María de Urgoiti in 1918, and Editorial Espasa, founded by José and Pau Espasa i Anguera in 1860.

The publisher, named Espasa-Calpe, was owned by Papelera Española. It became one of the most important publishers in Spain. The publisher later founded the Enciclopedia Espasa.

Espasa-Calpe opened Casa del Libro in Gran Vía, Madrid, which continued with the direction of Enciclopedia Espasa. In addition, it established a headquarters in Buenos Aires, where it was extended into Chile, Uruguay, Perú, Mexico and Cuba.

In 1991, Espasa-Calpe was acquired by Grupo Planeta, which paid 15.000 million Spanish pesetas.

References

Publishing companies of Spain
Publishing companies established in 1925
Organizations disestablished in 1991
Planeta Group